As of  , no person has been officially declared as the heir to the current leader nor as a nominee, though various sources have written on potential candidates.

The succession of Ali Khamenei, the current Supreme Leader of Iran, has been considered a taboo in Iran. Constitutionally, the Assembly of Experts is tasked to select the next leader, which its fifth and current term was elected in 2016 and is scheduled to preside until 2024.

Constitutional eligibility 

According to Article 111 of Constitution of the Islamic Republic of Iran, if the incumbent supreme leader dies in office or has been dismissed, the Assembly of Experts should immediately hold a session and select his successor as soon as they can. According to the same article, until the selection is made, a 'Provisional Leadership Council' is mandated to carry out the responsibilities of the supreme leader, which is made up of the incumbent President, the incumbent Chief Justice, and one of clerics of the Guardian Council who is selected by the Expediency Discernment Council.

Alleged plans 
In December 2015, Akbar Hashemi Rafsanjani said a committee in the Assembly of Experts "is examining potential candidates to be the next Supreme Leader." He also said the Assembly would be open to choosing "a council of leaders if needed" instead of a single leader.

Ahmad Khatami told press in 2016 that a committee made up of three Assembly members had given three names to the supreme leader "to seek his verdict", but later remarked what he said was "hypothetical" and blamed media for misreporting his words. Mohsen Araki, commented in June 2019 that the committee has drafted a "top secret list of prospective supreme leaders" and will present three names to the Assembly "when it is necessary." Hashem Hashemzadeh Herisi confirmed that such a committee exists, adding that the names on the list will not be disclosed. He also stated that the decisions made by the committee will not be fateful because  the next leader must be voted by a majority of all members in the assembly. Prior to that, in February 2019 Mohsen Mojtahed Shabestari had categorically dismissed allegations that Raisi and Khatami are considered as candidates for the next leader by the assembly, stating that the question "has never been debated at the assembly".

Speculations about potential successors by commentators 
The persons listed in this section are, according to analyses and comments made by various sources, potential candidates (the names are sorted by age):

Deceased candidates 
People mentioned below had been regarded as potential candidates during their lifetime.

Further reading

References

Future elections in Asia
Succession
Elections in Iran
Supreme Leaders of Iran